Brooks is an unincorporated community in Adams County, Iowa, United States.

History
Brooks was originally called Canaan City, and under the latter name was founded circa 1853.

References

Unincorporated communities in Adams County, Iowa
1853 establishments in Iowa
Populated places established in 1853
Unincorporated communities in Iowa